Yurendell Eithel DeCaster (born September 26, 1979) is a Dutch professional baseball third baseman. He played part of one season in Major League Baseball with the Pittsburgh Pirates. He played for Team Netherlands in the 2019 European Baseball Championship, and at the Africa/Europe 2020 Olympic Qualification tournament, in Italy in September 2019.

Career
Originally signed by the Tampa Bay Devil Rays as a free agent in 1996, DeCaster was selected by the Pittsburgh Pirates from Tampa Bay in the 2000 minor league phase of the Rule 5 draft.

DeCaster was one of just three players to hit three home runs in the 2004 Summer Olympic Games in Athens, Greece, while playing for the Netherlands team.

He spent the entire 2005 season with Triple-A Indianapolis Indians, where he made 28 appearances at third base, 25 at first base, 13 at second base and 58 in the outfield. He posted a .280 batting average with 11 home runs and 61 RBI, and also led his club in games played (122) and doubles (31).

Besides, he had a productive 2005–2006 season while playing for the Caribes de Anzoátegui of the Venezuelan Winter League, when he batted .325 (68-for-209) with 17 home runs and 47 RBI in just 60 games. His 17 home runs tied him with Tom Evans for the league lead.

In 2006, DeCaster returned to Indianapolis, with whom he spent most of the season. In 119 games with the Indians, he batted .273 with 11 home runs and 51 RBI. He was called up to the Pirates twice, from May 21–24 and June 5–13, and appeared in three games. He struck out in both of his at-bats in the majors.

He was released on December 9, 2006, but came back to Pittsburgh in 2007 and spent the whole season in the minor leagues with them.

On November 27, 2007, DeCaster signed a minor league contract with the Washington Nationals that included an invitation to the 2008 spring training. He then was assigned to the Double-A Harrisburg Senators of the Eastern League to begin the regular season, becoming a free agent at the end of the season.

In February 2009, DeCaster signed a minor league contract with the Detroit Tigers, but was released in April.

He began the 2009 season with the Fargo-Moorhead RedHawks of the Northern League, but on June 29, 2009, DeCaster's contract was purchased by the New York Yankees, who assigned him to the Triple-A Scranton/Wilkes-Barre Yankees. He was released on September 2.

He later played with the Reynosa Broncos of the Mexican League in 2010 and 2011, collecting a .339 average in 101 games for them in his season debut. He entered 2012 with the Olmecas de Tabasco, before joining the independent Winnipeg Goldeyes of the American Association during the midseason. He won the league championship, as the Goldeyes swept the Fargo-Moorhead RedHawks in the first round, 3 games to 0, and did the same with the Wichita Wingnuts in the championship finals 3 games to 0. DeCaster played with the Goldeyes for the 2013 season as well.

International career
DeCaster was on the preliminary roster for the 2009 Baseball World Cup.

DeCaster has played for the Netherlands national team in the World Baseball Classic during the  2006, 2009, and 2013 tournaments.

In the 2009 WBC edition, he lined a ball hard off of first-baseman Willy Aybar (credited an error) to score the winning run in the bottom of the 11th inning in his team's second game against the Dominican Republic team, securing the Netherlands a second-round berth in Pool 2.

For the 2012/13 season of the Nicaraguan Professional Baseball League, he played with Tigres del Chinandega and won the Triple Crown when he hit .417 and had 13 home runs and 56 RBI.

DeCaster returned to Winnipeg in 2013 and ended the year with the Acereros de Monclova. He combined for a .315 average in 94 games for both teams, including 13 homers, 64 RBI, and 171 total bases for a .461 slugging average.

He played for Team Netherlands in the 2019 European Baseball Championship, at the Africa/Europe 2020 Olympic Qualification tournament in Italy in September 2019, and at the 2019 WBSC Premier12.

References

External links

1979 births
Living people
Acereros de Monclova players
Águilas del Zulia players
Curaçao expatriate baseball players in Venezuela
Algodoneros de Guasave players
Altoona Curve players
Baseball players at the 2004 Summer Olympics
Baseball players at the 2008 Summer Olympics
Bravos de Margarita players
Broncos de Reynosa players
Caribes de Oriente players
Charleston RiverDogs players
Columbus Clippers players
Curaçao expatriate baseball players in Canada
Curaçao expatriate baseball players in Mexico
Curaçao expatriate baseball players in the United States
Fargo-Moorhead RedHawks players
Gulf Coast Devil Rays players
Harrisburg Senators players
Hickory Crawdads players
Indianapolis Indians players
Lynchburg Hillcats players
Major League Baseball players from Curaçao
Mayos de Navojoa players
Mexican League baseball first basemen
Mexican League baseball left fielders
Mexican League baseball right fielders
Mexican League baseball second basemen
Mexican League baseball third basemen
Olmecas de Tabasco players
Olympic baseball players of the Netherlands
Piratas de Campeche players
Pittsburgh Pirates players
Princeton Devil Rays players
Scranton/Wilkes-Barre Yankees players
Winnipeg Goldeyes players
2006 World Baseball Classic players
2009 World Baseball Classic players
2013 World Baseball Classic players
2016 European Baseball Championship players
2017 World Baseball Classic players
2019 European Baseball Championship players
Curaçao expatriate baseball players in Nicaragua